Suzanne Haïk-Vantoura (née Vantoura; 13 July 1912 – 22 October 2000) was a French organist, music teacher, composer and music theorist. Her main work was in the field of musicology.

Personal life

Vantoura was born in Paris on 13 July 1912. In 1931 Vantoura started studying at Conservatoire National Supérieur de Paris, (CNSMDP), and in 1934 earned a First Prize in Harmony. Four years later, she was awarded a First Prize in Fugue (1938). She was a pupil of the well-known organist and composer Marcel Dupré from 1941 to 1946.

During World War II, Vantoura and her family fled from the Nazis to southern France. There she studied the cantillation marks (also melodic accents or ta'amim), in the Hebrew Bible (Masoretic Text), forming the basic hypothesis of her system for decoding the Masoretic cantillation. After the war she put aside this work and did not resume it until, after her retirement in 1970, she finally published her system in La Musique de la Bible revélée (1st ed.: 1976).  She died on 22 October 2000 in Lausanne, Switzerland at the age of 88.  Her husband Maurice Haïk had died in 1976.  The couple had no children.

Career
She was Honorary professor of music education (1937–61). 
She was organist at the Synagogue de l'Union liberale Israelite de Paris (1946–53) and organist at the Église Saint-Hélène in Paris (1966–79).

Compositions
 Quatuor florentin, 1942
 Un beau dimanche, 1957
 Destin d'Israël, 1964
 Versets de psaumes, 1968
 Offrande, 1970
 Adagio for saxophone and organ, 1976

Music of the Bible Revealed
Music of the Bible Revealed was her magnum opus; a massive work covering the entire Hebrew Bible, decoding the cantillation marks (as musical notes which support the syntax and meaning of the words) of its 24 books, to music.

Study
Vantoura argues that the accentual system preserved in the Masoretic Text was originally a method of recording hand signals ("chironomy") by which temple musicians were directed in the performance of music.

Noticing the marks in the version of the Hebrew Bible she used to read, Vantoura affirmed she had read in an unnamed encyclopedia that these signs of cantillation dated back to antiquity and that their real musical meaning was lost. This, she said, triggered her curiosity. Working step by step, she made the assumption it was significant that the sublinear signs were never absent from the text, while entire verses are totally lacking supralinear signs. In her opinion it had to mean that the sublinear signs had to be "more important" than the supralinear ones. This conclusion formed the basis of her conjectures. She focused on the prose te'amim system only. That system comprises 8 sublinear signs. She made the hypothesis that it corresponded to the eight degrees of a musical scale, particularly of a tonal scale, (the diatonic scale - C, D, E, etc. - being the oldest). In her mind that was supported by the nearly systematic writing of a vertical sign at the end of each verse. This sign, she assumed, could work like an end note, and could be used to indicate the main note (tonic) of a scale. As she worked with each verse she became convinced that the notes of her transcription formed coherent melodies and not random sounds. By comparing individual verses she then compiled tables of concordant sequences. Analyzing the shapes of signs, she finally assigned conjectural values to the 8 sublinear signs of the prose system, suggesting that they are the 8 notes of a scale.

Some musicologists view as unlikely her hypothesis that the signs represent the degrees of a scale. It is asserted that what seems to be her method is flawed. (I.e., in the eyes of some critics, her method appears to assign the values of the signs arbitrarily, based only on a subjective assessment of the musical quality of the melody that a given assignment produces.) Nevertheless, her reconstruction of these notations allowed her to perform around the world the haunting, beautiful and spiritually uplifting music thus "recovered".

The work to pursue this conjectural decipherment and to justify its methodology and assumptions has been carried on since her death by her students and associates Gilles Tiar and John H. Wheeler (Johanan Rakkav on the net) who had some success in spreading her theories.

In 1978 the Institut de France awarded the second edition of Haik-Vantoura's French book the Prix Bernier, its highest award. Encyclopaedia Universalis, a French online encyclopedia, presents her work as a firmly scientifically established conclusion.  Some musicians have also produced recorded music based on her alleged decipherment, more particularly the French harp player Esther Lamandier. Haik-Vantoura's work has been rejected by some researchers as based on Western preconceptions and subjective assignments, coupled with historical misunderstandings. However author David C. Mitchell has defended it, noting that it agrees closely with the best remaining fragments of ancient psalmody.

Electronic download of four of Haik-Vantoura's recorded albums is currently possible (16 May 2022) from web address https://shirhashirim.org.il/songs.php

Publications
A partial listing of Haik-Vantoura's publications (which ultimately included about 5,000 verses of the Masoretic Text) follows:

 La musique de la Bible revélée (book), 1976; second revised edition, 1978 (Dessain et Tolra)
 La musique de la Bible revélée (LP), 1976 (Harmonia Mundi France HMU 989)
 Quatre Meghilot: Esther, L'Ecclesiaste, Les Lamentations, Ruth dans leurs mélodies d'origine (melody-only score), 1986
 The Music of the Bible Revealed (book), trans. Dennis Weber, ed. John Wheeler, 1991 (BIBAL Press)
 Les 150 Psaumes dans leurs mélodies antiques (melody-only score), revised French-English edition, 1991
 Message biblique intégral dans son chant retrouvé (melody-only score), 1992

References

Sources
 Obituaries of French musicians 10/2000 
 Orientations in Piano Creation of Banat in the period between the two World Wars 
 Haïk-Vantoura's personal Web site (down since 2002; archive available from [www.archive.org]) 
 Temple Cantillation of Psalms (Jewish Encyclopedia, 1906)

External links
 List of articles in journals 
 on the book "The Music of the Bible Revealed"

1912 births
2000 deaths
20th-century French musicologists
Women musicologists
20th-century French composers
French classical organists
Women organists
Jewish women musicians
20th-century classical musicians
20th-century organists
20th-century French women musicians
Jewish women composers
20th-century women composers